Kiran Gandhi (born February 21, 1989), also known by her stage name Madame Gandhi, is an American electronic music producer, drummer, artist and activist.

Gandhi's music career includes being a touring drummer for artists M.I.A., Thievery Corporation, and Kehlani. Her music and activism focuses on female empowerment and fourth-wave feminism. In 2015, Gandhi ran the London Marathon bleeding freely on her period to combat the menstrual stigma people face around the world, sparking a viral conversation about how menstruation is treated in various cultures. She has performed in music festivals such as Pitchfork, Lightning in a Bottle, Roskilde and SXSW.

Life and career

Early life and education
Gandhi, born February 21, 1989, is the daughter of philanthropist Meera Gandhi and social entrepreneur Vikram Gandhi. Growing up, Gandhi spent time in both New York City and Bombay, India.

In 2011, Gandhi received her undergraduate degree in mathematics, political science and women's studies from Georgetown University. After graduating she began an internship as the first digital analyst at Interscope Records based in Santa Monica, California. This position later became full-time. Gandhi used her mathematics skill to analyze patterns in Spotify streaming data and other digital media.

In 2015 Gandhi received her MBA from Harvard University.

Early career
In 2012, Gandhi recorded live drums accompanying the M.I.A. track "Bad Girls." In February 2013, M.I.A. wrote to Gandhi praising the recording and asked her to play drums for the tour supporting the album Matangi. At the same time Gandhi accepted an offer to study at Harvard Business School. Gandhi left Interscope Records in 2013.

2016-2017: Voices
In 2016, her debut musical release Voices (EP) was published.

In 2017, Gandhi collaborated with female-identifying producers to release Voices Remixed. That year, she also ran the Vancouver Marathon and was the opening act for Ani DiFranco's Rise Up Tour. Gandhi toured Europe and India and also spoke at Airbnb, Pandora Radio, Spotify, the United Nations, and on college campuses.

2019: Visions
In 2019, Gandhi's second musical release Visions (EP) was published, beginning her new partnership with Sony Music Masterworks.

Public Image
In 2015, Gandhi ran the London Marathon bleeding-freely on her period as a symbolic act to combat the menstrual stigma that women, girls and trans people face around the world.

She is openly queer.

Awards
Best Music Video jury award-winner 2021 at SXSW

2020 Ted Fellow 

Gandhi was on the list of the BBC's 100 Women announced on 23 November 2020.

Gandhi was in Forbes 30 Under 30 class of 2019

2015 Harvard University Fitzie Foundation Prize Winner

References

External links 
 
 

Electronica musicians
Musicians from Boston
Living people
Harvard Business School alumni
Georgetown College (Georgetown University) alumni
1989 births
BBC 100 Women
American LGBT singers
American women singers
American people of Indian descent
American feminists
American people of Irish descent
21st-century American women
Queer singers
Indian LGBT singers